This is a list of women pacifists and peace activists by nationality – notable women who are well known for their work in promoting pacifism.

Introduction
Women have been active in peace movements since at least the 19th century. After the First World War broke out in 1914, many women's organizations became involved in peace activities. In 1915, the International Congress of Women in the Hague brought together representatives from women's associations in several countries, leading to the establishment of the Women's International League for Peace and Freedom. This in turn led to national chapters which continued their work in the 1920s and 1930s. After the Second World War, European women once again became involved in peace initiatives, mainly as a result of the Cold War, while from the 1960s the Vietnam War led to renewed interest in the United States.

Armenia
 Lucy Thoumaian (1890–1940) – Armenian women's rights and peace activist.

Australia
 Eva Bacon (1909–1994) – Australian socialist, feminist, pacifist
 Doris Blackburn (1889–1970) – Australian social reformer, politician, pacifist
 Helen Caldicott (born 1938) – Australian physician, anti-nuclear activist, revived Physicians for Social Responsibility, campaigner against the dangers of radiation
 Margaret Holmes, AM (1909–2009) – Australian activist during the Vietnam War, member Anglican Pacifist Fellowship
 Isabel Longworth (1881–1961) – Australian dentist and peace activist
 Ciaron O'Reilly (born 1960) – Australian pacifist, anti-war activist, Catholic Worker, served prison time in America and Ireland for disarming war material
 Nancy Shelley OAM (1926–2010) – Quaker who represented the Australian peace movement at the UN in 1982
 Barbara Grace Tucker – Australian peace activist, long time participant of London's Parliament Square Peace Campaign
 Jo Vallentine (born 1946) – Australian politician and peace activist
 Kathleen Deery de Phelps (1908–2001) – conservationist, philanthropist

Austria
 Hildegard Goss-Mayr (born 1930) — Austrian pacifist and theologian
 Yella Hertzka (1873–1948) – Austrian peace and women's rights activist
 Leopoldine Kulka (1872–1920) – Austrian writer, editor and pacifist
 Helene Lecher (1865–1929) – Austrian pacifist and philanthropist
 Olga Misař (1876–1950) – Austrian peace activist, feminist and writer
 Helene Scheu-Riesz (1880–1970), peace activist, children's writer, publisher
 Bertha von Suttner (1843–1914) – Czech-Austrian pacifist, first woman Nobel peace laureate

Botswana
 Malebogo Molefhe (born 1980) – Botswanan activist against gender-based violence

Belgium
 Eugénie Hamer (1865–after 1926) – peace activist, editor and writer
 Léonie La Fontaine (1857–1949) – Belgian feminist and pacifist

Bulgaria
 Ekaterina Karavelova (1860–1947) – Bulgarian educator, writer, suffragist, feminist, pacifist

Canada
 Edith Ballantyne (born 1922) – Czech-Canadian peace activist
 Christine Ross Barker (1866–1940) – Canadian pacifist and suffragist
 Alice Amelia Chown (1866–1949) – Canadian feminist, pacifist and writer
 Muriel Duckworth (1908–2009) – Canadian pacifist, feminist and community activist, founder of Nova Scotia Voice of Women for Peace
 Mildred Fahrni (1900–1992) – Canadian pacifist, feminist, internationally active in the peace movement
 Ursula Franklin (1921–2016) – German-Canadian scientist, pacifist and feminist, whose research helped end atmospheric nuclear testing
 Rae Luckock (1893–1972) – Canadian feminist, peace activist and politician
 Simonne Monet-Chartrand (1919–1993) – Canadian women's rights activist, feminist, pacifist
 Alaa Murabit (born 1989) – Libyan-Canadian physician and human rights advocate for inclusive peace and security
 Harriet Dunlop Prenter (fl. 1921) – Canadian feminist, pacifist
 Setsuko Thurlow (born 1932) – Japanese-Canadian non-nuclear weapon activist, figure of International Campaign to Abolish Nuclear Weapons
 Julia Grace Wales (1881–1957) – Canadian academic and pacifist

Chile
 Nicolasa Quintremán (1939-2013) – Chilean Pehuenche activist

Colombia
 Yolanda Becerra (born 1959) – Colombian feminist and peace activist.

Costa Rica
 Olga Bianchi (1924–2015) – feminist, pacifist and women's rights activist

Cyprus
Katherine Clerides (born 1949) – Cypriot peace activist.

Denmark
 Matilde Bajer (1840–1934) – Danish feminist and peace activists
 Henriette Beenfeldt (1878–1949) – radical Danish peace activist
 Benny Cederfeld de Simonsen (1865–1952) – Danish peace activist
 Henriette Crone (1874–1933) – trade unionist, peace activist and politician
 Thora Daugaard (1874–1951) – Danish feminist, pacifist, journal editor and translator
 Henni Forchhammer (1863–1955) – Danish educator, feminist and pacifist
 Eline Hansen (1859–1919) – Danish feminist and peace activist
 Estrid Hein (1873–1956) – Danish ophthalmologist, women's rights activist and pacifist
 Ellen Hørup (1871–1953) – Danish writer, pacifist and women's rights activist
 Johanne Meyer (1838–1915) – pioneering Danish suffragist, pacifist and journal editor
 Eva Moltesen (1871–1934) – Finnish-Danish writer and peace activist
 Camilla Nielsen (1856–1932) – Danish philanthropist, feminist and peace activist
 Louise Nørlund (1854–1919) – Danish feminist and peace activist
 Voldborg Ølsgaard (1877–1939) – Danish peace and women's rights activist
 Clara Tybjerg (1864–1941) – Danish feminist, peace activist and educator
 Louise Wright (1861–1935) – Danish philanthropist, feminist and peace activist
 Else Zeuthen (1897–1975) – Danish peace activist, feminist and politician

Finland
 Maikki Friberg (1861–1927) – Finnish educator, journal editor, suffragist and peace activist.
 Lucina Hagman (1853–1946) – Finnish feminist, politician, pacifist.
 Helena Kekkonen (1926–2014), Finnish peace activist and peace educator.

France
 Marcelle Capy (1891–1962) – French novelist, journalist, pacifist
 Bernadette Cattanéo (1899-1963) – French trade unionist, communist activist, newspaper editor, magazine co-founder
 Fanny Clar (1875-1944) – French journalist and writer
 Gabrielle Duchêne (1870–1954) – French feminist and pacifist
 Solange Fernex (1934–2006) – French peace activist and politician
 Suzanne Grinberg (1899–1972) – French lawyer, pacifist, suffragist and writer
 France Hamelin (1918–2007) – French artist, peace activist and resistance worker
 Germaine Malaterre-Sellier (1889–1967) – French nurse, suffragist and pacifist
 Jeanne Mélin (1877–1964) – French pacifist, feminist, writer and politician
 Maria Pognon (1844–1925) – French writer, feminist, suffragist and pacifist
 Marie-Louise Puech-Milhau (1876–1966) – French pacifist, feminist and journal editor
 Colette Reynaud (1872–1965) – French feminist, socialist and pacifist journalist
 Madeleine Vernet (1878–1949) – French educator, writer and pacifist

Germany
 Anita Augspurg (1857–1943) – German lawyer, writer, feminist, pacifist 
 Gertrud Baer (1890–1981) – German Jewish peace activist, and a founding member of the Women's International League for Peace and Freedom
Hedwig Dohm (1831–1919) – German feminist, writer, pacifist  
 Lida Gustava Heymann (1868–1943) – German feminist, pacifist and women's rights activist
 Petra Kelly (1947–1992) – German politician, feminist, pacifist
 Annette Kolb (1870–1967) – German writer and pacifist
 Rosa Luxemburg (1871–1919) – German marxist and anti–war activist.
 Renate Riemeck (1920–2003) – German historian and Christian peace activist
 Sophie Scholl (1921–1943) – German Christian pacifist, active in the White Rose non-violent resistance movement in Nazi Germany
 Margarethe Lenore Selenka (1860–1922) – German zoologist, feminist and pacifist
 Clara Zetkin (1857–1933) – German Maxist, feminist and pacifist

Guatemala
 Rigoberta Menchú (born 1959) – Guatemalan indigenous rights, anti-war, co-founder Nobel Women's Initiative, Nobel Peace Prize recipient

Hungary
 Vilma Glücklich (1872–1927) – Hungarian educator, pacifist and women's rights activist
 Rosika Schwimmer (1877–1948) – Hungarian pacifist, feminist and suffragist.

India
 Kirthi Jayakumar (born 1987) – Indian peace activist and gender equality activist, youth peace activist, peace educator and founder of The Red Elephant Foundation
 Gurmehar Kaur (born 1996) – Indian student and peace activist
 Mother Teresa (1910–1997) – Albanian-Indian Roman Catholic nun, missionary, pacifist, Nobel Peace Prize recipient
 Medha Patkar (born 1954) – Indian activist for Tribals and Dalits affected by dam projects
 Manasi Pradhan (born 1962) – Indian activist; founder of Honour for Women National Campaign
 Arundhati Roy (born 1961) – Indian writer, social critic and peace activist

Iran
 Shirin Ebadi (born 1947) – Iranian lawyer, human rights activist, Nobel peace laureate

Iraq
 Nadia Murad (born 1993) – Iraqi human rights activist, Nobel Prize laureate

Ireland
 Caoimhe Butterly (born 1978) – Irish peace and human rights activist
 Helen Chenevix (1886–1963) – Irish suffragist, trade unionist, pacifist
 Molly Childers (1875–1964) – Irish writer, nationalist, pacifist
 Margaretta D'Arcy (born 1934) – Irish actress, writer and peace activist
 Adi Roche (born 1955) – Irish activist, chief executive of the charity Chernobyl Children International
 Lilian Stevenson (1870–1960) – Irish peace activist and historiographer

Israel
 Marcia Freedman (born 1938) – American-Israeli peace activist, feminist and supporter of gay rights
 Dahlia Ravikovitch (1936–2005) – Israeli poet and peace activist
 Hagar Rublev (1954–2000) – Israeli peace activist, founder of Women in Black
 Ada Yonath (born 1939) – Israeli Laureate of the Nobel Prize in Chemistry, 2009, pacifist

Italy

Elisa Agnini Lollini (1858–1922) – pioneering Italian feminist, pacifist, suffragist and politician.
 Cora di Brazza (1862-1944) – designer of the peace flag, pacifist.
Alma Dolens (1869–1948) –pacifist, suffragist, journalist
 Alaide Gualberta Beccari (1842–1906) – Italian feminist, pacifist and social reformer
 Rosa Genoni (1867–1954) – Italian fashion designer, feminist, pacifist.
Linda Malnati (1855–1921) – influential women's rights activist, trade unionist, suffragist, pacifist and writer
Virginia Tango Piatti (1869–1958) – writer and pacifist, WILPF delegate
Graziella Sonnino (born 1884) – feminist and peace activist
 Ida Vassalini (1891–1953) – chair of the Milanese WILPF chapter from 1922 to 1927

Ivory Coast
 Aya Virginie Toure – Ivorian peace activist, proponent of non-violent resistance

Japan
 Atsuko Betchaku (1960–2017) – pacifist and educator
 Marii Hasegawa (1918–2012) – Japanese peace activist
 Raichō Hiratsuka (1886–1971) – Japanese writer, political activist, feminist, pacifist
 Tano Jōdai (1886–1982) – Japanese English literature professor, peace activist and university president
 Shina Inoue Kan (1899–1982) – Japanese academic, women's rights activist and pacifist
 Yosano Akiko (1878–1942) – Japanese writer, feminist, pacifist

Kenya
 Wangari Maathai (1940–2011) – Kenyan environmental activist, Nobel peace laureate

Lebanon
 Lydia Canaan – Lebanese singer, first rock star of the Middle East, risked life to perform under military attack in protest of Lebanese Civil War

Liberia
 Comfort Freeman – Liberian anti-war activist
 Leymah Gbowee (born 1972) – Liberian peace activist, organizer of women's peace movement in Liberia, awarded 2011 Nobel Peace Prize
 Ellen Johnson Sirleaf (born 1938) – President of Liberia, shared 2011 Nobel Peace Prize with Tawakkol Karman and Leymah Gbowee in recognition of "their non-violent struggle for the safety of women and for women's rights to full participation in peace-building work"

Lithuania
 Gabrielle Radziwill (1877–1968) – Lithuanian pacifist, feminist and League of Nations official

Myanmar
 Aung San Suu Kyi (born 1945) – Burmese politician, author, Nobel Peace Prize recipient

Netherlands
 Mia Boissevain (1878–1959) – Dutch zoologist, feminist and pacifist
 Suze Groeneweg (1875–1940) – Dutch politician, feminist and pacifist
 Aletta Jacobs (1854–1929) – Dutch physician, feminist and peace activist
 Rosa Manus (1881–1942) – Dutch pacifist and suffragist.
 Adrienne van Melle-Hermans (1931–2007) – Dutch peace activist
 Selma Meyer (1890–1941) – Dutch pacifist and resistance fighter of Jewish origin
 Cornelia Ramondt-Hirschmann (1871–1957) – Dutch teacher, feminist and pacifist
 Titia van der Tuuk (1854–1939) – Dutch feminist and pacifist
 Krista van Velzen (born 1974) – Dutch politician, pacifist and antimilitarist
 Mien van Wulfften Palthe (1875–1960) – Dutch feminist, suffragist and pacifist

New Zealand
Millicent Baxter (1888–1984) – peace activist
Kate Dewes (born 1954) – disarmament activist, pacifist
Kae Miller (1910–1994) – peace activist, pacifist, mental health advocate.
Margaret Sievwright (1844–1905) – feminist, peace activist
 Miriam Soljak (1879–1971) – New Zealand feminist, rights activist and pacifist

Norway
 Elise M. Boulding (1920–2010) – Norwegian-born American sociologist, specialising in academic peace research
 Gunhild Emanuelsen (1914–2006) – pacifist, women's rights activist
 Ingrid Fiskaa (born 1977) – Norwegian politician and peace activist
 Louise Keilhau (1860–1927) – peace activist, educator
 Martha Larsen Jahn (1875–1954) – Norwegian peace activist and feminist
 Louise Keilhau (1860–1927) – Norwegian teacher and pacifist
 Sigrid Helliesen Lund (1892–1987) – Norwegian peace activist
 Guri Tambs-Lyche (1917–2008) – Norwegian women's rights activist and pacifist
 Ida Wedel-Jarlsberg (1855–1929) – peace activist, feminist, artist

Pakistan
 Malala Yousafzai (born 1997) – Pakistani education activist, Nobel Prize laureate

Palau
 Gabriela Ngirmang (1922–2007) – Palauan peace and anti-nuclear activist

Serbia
 Zorica Jevremović (born 1948) – Serbian playwright, theatre director, peace activist
 Nataša Kandić (born 1946) – human rights and anti-war activist
 Lepa Mladjenovic (born 1954) – anti-war activist, feminist

South Africa
 Elizabeth Maria Molteno (1852–1927) – women's rights and peace activist
 Olive Schreiner (1855–1920) – writer and anti-war campaigner
 Julia Solly (1862–1953) – British-born South African suffragist, feminist, pacifist

Spain
 Carmen Magallón (born 1951) – Spanish physicist, pacifist, conducting research in support of women's advancement in science and peace
 Concepción Picciotto (1936–2016) – Spanish-born anti-nuclear and anti-war protester, White House Peace Vigil

Sweden
 Andrea Andreen (1888–1972) – Swedish physician, pacifist and feminist
 Sonja Branting-Westerståhl (1890–1981) – Swedish lawyer and politician.
 Emilia Broomé (1866–1925) – Swedish politician, feminist and peace activist
 Siri Derkert (1888–1973) – Swedish artist, pacifist and feminist
 Greta Engkvist (1893–1990) – Swedish peace activist and educator
 Beatrice Fihn (born 1982) – Swedish anti-nuclear activist, chairperson of International Campaign to Abolish Nuclear Weapons
 Ann-Margret Holmgren (1850–1940) – Swedish writer, feminist and pacifist
 Anna Kleman (1862–1940) – Swedish suffragist and peace activist
 Elisabeth Krey-Lange (1878–1965) – journalist, women's rights activist and pacifist
 Agda Montelius (1850–1920) – Swedish philanthropist, feminist, peace activist
 Alva Myrdal (1902–1986) – Swedish sociologist, politician, pacifist, Nobel Peace Prize recipient
Anna T. Nilsson (1869–1947), educator, peace activist
Vera Nilsson (1888–1979), painter and peace activist
Betty Olsson (1871–1950), suffragist and peace activist
Rosalinde von Ossietzky-Palm (1919–2000), German-born Nazi emigrant and pacifist
Ellen Palmstierna (1869–1941), Swedish women's rights and peace activist
Annika Söder (born 1955), Swedish politician, diplomat and pacifist
Gunhild Tegen (1889–1970), writer, translator, pacifist
Matilda Widegren (1863–1938), educator and committed peace activist

Switzerland
Élisabeth Decrey Warner (born 1953) – Swiss peace activist, founder of Geneva Call
Laurence Deonna (born 1937) – writer and peace activist
Marguerite Gobat (1870–1937) – Swiss editor, teacher and pacifist
 Idy Hegnauer (1909–2006) – Swiss nurse and peace activist
 Émilie de Morsier (1843–1896) – Swiss feminist, pacifist and abolitionist
 Clara Ragaz (1874–1957) – Swiss pacifist and feminist.
 Elisabeth Rotten (1882–1964) – German-born Swiss peace activist and education reformer
Annelise Rüegg (1879–1934) – pacifist, communist and writer
Helene Stähelin (1891–1970) – mathematician, peace activist
Camille Vidart (1854–1930) – educator, women's rights activist and pacifist

United Kingdom
 Ruth Adler (1944–1994) – feminist, and human rights campaigner in Scotland
 Pat Arrowsmith (born 1930) – British author and peace campaigner
 Margaret Ashton (1856–1937) – British suffragist, local politician, pacifist
 Meg Beresford (born 1937) – British activist, European Nuclear Disarmament movement
 Janet Bloomfield (1953–2007) – British peace and disarmament campaigner, chair of the Campaign for Nuclear Disarmament
 Brigid Brophy (1929–1995) – British novelist, feminist, pacifist
 Vera Brittain (1893–1970) – British writer, pacifist
 April Carter (born 1937) – British peace activist, researcher, editor
 Ada Nield Chew (1870–1945) – British suffragist and pacifist
 Helena Cobban (born 1952) – British peace activist, journalist, author
 Kathleen Courtney (1878–1974) – British suffragist and pacifist
 Helen Crawfurd (1877–1954) – Scottish suffragette, Communist activist and pacifist
 Agnes Dollan (1887–1966) – Scottish suffragette, political activist and pacifist
 Peggy Duff (1910–1981) – British peace activist, socialist, founder and first General Secretary of CND
 Diana Francis (born 1944) – British peace activist and scholar, former president of the International Fellowship of Reconciliation
 Margaret Hills (1882–1967) – British educator, suffragist, feminist and pacifist
 Emily Hobhouse (1860–1926) – British welfare campaigner
 Kate Hudson (born 1958) – British left-wing political activist and academic; General Secretary of the Campaign for Nuclear Disarmament (CND) and National Secretary of Left Unity; officer of the Stop the War Coalition since 2002
 Kathleen Innes (1883–1967) – British educator, writer, pacifist
 Helen John – British activist, one of the first full-time members of the Greenham Common peace camp
 Muriel Lester (1885–1968) – British social reformer, pacifist and nonconformist; Ambassador and Secretary for the International Fellowship of Reconciliation; co-founder of the Kingsley Hall
 Chrystal Macmillan (1872–1937) – Scottish politician, feminist, pacifist
 Mairead Maguire (born 1944) – Northern Ireland peace movement, Nobel peace laureate
 Sybil Morrison (1893–1984) – British pacifist active in the Peace Pledge Union
 Marian Cripps, Baroness Parmoor (1878–1952) – British anti-war activist
 Priscilla Hannah Peckover (1833–1931) – English pacifist, nominated four times for the Nobel Peace Prize
 Lindis Percy (born 1941) – British nurse, midwife, pacifist, founder of the Campaign for the Accountability of American Bases (CAAB)
 Madeleine Rees (fl. from 1990s) – British lawyer, human right and peace proponent
 Ellen Robinson (1840–1912) – British peace campaigner
 Ada Salter (1866–1942) – English Quaker, pacifist, a founding member of Women's International League for Peace and Freedom
 Molly Scott Cato (born 1963) – British green economist, Green Party politician, pacifist and anti-nuclear campaigner
 Mary Sheepshanks (1872–1960) – British pacifist, feminist, journalist and social worker
 Myrtle Solomon (1921–1987) – British General Secretary of the Peace Pledge Union and Chair of War Resisters International
 Frances Benedict Stewart (fl. 1920s–1950s) – Chilean-born American sociologist, pacifist, feminist and Bahá'í pioneer
 Ada Salter (1866–1942) – English Quaker, pacifist, a founding member of Women's International League for Peace and Freedom
 Ethel Snowden (1881–1951) – British socialist, human rights activist, feminist politician and pacifist
 Sophia Sturge (1849–1936) – British Quaker, social reformer, and pacifist
 Helena Swanwick (1864–1939) – British feminist and pacifist
 Kathleen Tacchi-Morris (1899–1993) – British dancer, founder of Women for World Disarmament
 Helen Thomas (1966–1989) – Welsh peace activist, died at Greenham Common Women's Peace Camp
 Sybil Thorndike (1882–1976) – British actress and pacifist; member of the Peace Pledge Union who gave readings for its benefit
 Evelyn Underhill (1875–1941) – English Anglo-Catholic writer and pacifist
 Betty Williams (born 1943) – Northern Irish pacifist, recipient of the Nobel Peace Prize in 1976
 Lilian Wolfe (1875–1974) – British anarchist, pacifist, feminist
 Angie Zelter (born 1951) – British anti-war and anti-nuclear activist, co-founder of Trident Ploughshares

United States
 Bella Abzug (1920–1998) – American lawyer, politician, social activist and pacifist
 Jane Addams (1860–1935) – American, national chairman of Woman's Peace Party, president of Women's International League for Peace and Freedom, and 1931 Nobel peace laureate.
 Fannie Fern Andrews (1867–1950) – American educator, writer, social worker and pacifist
 Joan Baez (born 1941) – prominent American anti-war protester, inspirational singer
 Ella Baker (1903–1986) – African-American civil rights activist, feminist, pacifist
 Emily Greene Balch (1867–1961) – American pacifist, leader of Women's International League for Peace and Freedom, and 1946 Nobel peace laureate
 Medea Benjamin (born 1952) – American author, organizer, co-founder of the anti-militarist Code Pink
 Norma Elizabeth Boyd (1888–1985) – African American politically active educator, children's rights proponent, pacifist
 Heloise Brainerd (1881–1869) – American women activist, pacifist
 Sophonisba Breckinridge (1866–1948) – American educator, social reformer, pacifist
 Olympia Brown (1835–1926) – American theologist, suffragist, pacifist
 Gertrude C. Bussey (1888–1961) – American philosopher, peace activist
 Joan Chittister (born 1936) – American Benedictine nun, prioress, writer, pacifist, co-chair of the Global Peace Initiative of Women
 Judy Collins (born 1939) – inspirational American anti-war singer-songwriter, protester
 Rachel Corrie (1979–2003) – American activist for Palestinian human rights
 Frances Crowe (born 1919) – American pacifist, anti-nuclear power activist, draft counselor supporting conscientious objectors
 Dorothy Day (1897–1980) – American journalist, social activist, and co-founder of the Catholic Worker movement
 Dorothy Detzer (1893–1981) – American feminist, peace activist, U.S. secretary of the Women's International League for Peace and Freedom 
 Amanda Deyo (1838–1917) – American Universalist minister, peace activist, correspondent
 Mary Dingman (1875–1961) – American social and peace activist
 Roberta Dunbar (died 1956) – American clubwoman and peace activist
 Crystal Eastman (1881–1928) – American lawyer, suffragist, pacifist, journalist
Cynthia Enloe (born 1938) – American writer and feminist peace theorist 
 Hedy Epstein (1924–2016) – Jewish-American antiwar activist, escaped Nazi Germany on the Kindertransport; active in opposition to Israeli military policies
 Jodie Evans (born 1954) – American political activist, co-founder of Code Pink, filmmaker
 Genevieve Fiore (1912–2002) – American women's rights and peace activist
 Jane Fonda (born 1937) – American anti-war protester, actress
 Elisabeth Freeman (1876–1942) – American suffragist, civil rights activist and pacifist
 Emma Goldman (1869–1940) – Russian/American activist imprisoned in the U.S. for opposition to World War I
 Amy Goodman (born 1957) – American journalist, host of Democracy Now!
 Alice Hamilton (1869–1970) – American physician, toxicologist, humanitarian and peace activist
 Judith Hand (born 1940) – American biologist, pioneer of peace ethology
 Florence Jaffray Harriman (1870–1967) – American suffragist, social reformer, pacifist and diplomat
 Erna P. Harris (1908-1995) – African-American journalist, civil rights and peace activist
 Alice Herz (1882–1965) – German-born American peace activist
 Jessie Jack Hooper
 Julia Ward Howe (1819–1910) – American writer, social activist, peace advocate
 Hannah Clothier Hull (1872–1958) – American Quaker activist, in the leadership of WILPF in the US
 Inez Jackson (1907–1993) – African American pacifist and civil rights activist
 Lisa Kalvelage (1923–2009) – German-born American anti-war activist remembered as one of the Napalm ladies
 Helen Keller (1880–1968) – American activist, deafblind writer, speech "Strike Against The War" Carnegie Hall, New York 1916
 Kathy Kelly (born 1952) – American peace and anti-war activist, arrested over 60 times during protests; member and organizer of international peace teams
 Coretta Scott King (1927–2006) – American writer, civil rights leader and pacifist
 Lola Maverick Lloyd (1875–1944) – American pacifist, suffragist, feminist
 Elizabeth McAlister (born 1939) – American former nun, co-founder of Jonah House, peace activist
 Bertha McNeill (1887–1979) – African-American WILPF leader and civil rights activist
 Ava Helen Pauling (1903–1981) – American human rights activist, feminist, pacifist
 Jeannette Rankin (1880–1973) – first woman elected to the U.S. Congress, lifelong pacifist
 Coleen Rowley (born 1954) – ex-FBI agent, whistleblower, peace activist, and the first recipient of the Sam Adams Award
 Cindy Sheehan (born 1957) – American anti-Iraq and anti-Afghanistan war leader
 Jeanmarie Simpson (born 1959) – American feminist, peace activist
 Samantha Smith (1972–1985) – American schoolgirl, young advocate of peace between Soviets and Americans
 Eve Tetaz (born 1931) – retired American teacher, peace and justice activist
 Lillian Wald (1867–1940) – American nurse, writer, human rights activist, suffragist and pacifist
 Mary Wilhelmine Williams (1878–1944) – American historian, feminist and pacifist
 Anita Parkhurst Willcox (1892–1984) – American artist, feminist, pacifist
 Fanny Garrison Villard (1844–1928) – American suffragist and pacifist, 
 Alice Walker (born 1944) – American novelist, feminist and pacifist
 Jody Williams (born 1950) – American anti-landmine advocate and organizer, Nobel peace laureate
 Dagmar Wilson (1916–2011) – American illustrator, pacifist, founder of Women Strike for Peace
Mary Emma Woolley (1863-1947) – American educator, peace activist, sole US female delegate to the Conference on Reduction and Limitation of Armaments

Venezuela
 Sheyene Gerardi – human rights advocate, peace activist, founder of the SPACE Movement

Yemen
 Tawakkol Karman (born 1979) – Yemini journalist, politician and human rights activist; shared 2011 Nobel Peace prize

See also
List of peace activists
Women's International League for Peace and Freedom
List of women's rights activists

References

Pacifists
Women pacifists
Pacifists
Women pacifists
Women